For Madmen Only is the first studio album by English rock band UK Decay. It was released in October 1981 by record label Fresh.

Track listing 

All songs written by UK Decay.

A1. "Duel"
A2. "Battle of the Elements"
A3. "Shattered"
A4. "Stage Struck"
A5. "Last in the House of Flames"
B1. "Unexpected Guest"
B2. "Sexual"
B3. "Dorian"
B4. "Decadence"
B5. "Mayday Malady"
B6. "For Madmen Only"

Critical reception 

Record Collector called the album "a mature statement from beginning to end".

Personnel 

 Creeton (Creeton K-OS) – bass guitar, production
 Twiggy – bass guitar, production
 Steven (Steve Harle) – drums, production
 Spon (Steve Spon) – guitar, piano, production

 Technical

 Abbo (Steven Abbot) – recording
 Bernard Chandler – sleeve design and artwork
 Jan Toorop – front cover painting The Disintegration of Faith
 John Loder – engineering, production
 Simon Scofield – engineering
 Tony Cook – engineering

References

External links 

 

1981 albums
UK Decay albums